Lake railway station is a station on the Isle of Wight serving the village of Lake, situated in a quiet residential area not far from Lake Cliff Gardens and the beach at Sandown Bay. Until the construction of an interchange station with the Isle of Wight Steam Railway at Smallbrook Junction in 1991, this station was the newest on the island having opened by British Rail in 1987. The Station is formed of a single platform with a shelter. The station is served by South Western Railway under their Island Line branding using Class 484 units formed from refurbished Ex London Underground D78 Stock. This follows the retirement of the Class 483 units which were formed from former London Underground 1938 Tube Stock.

As of May 2022, there are two trains in each direction per hour during the peak and one during the off-peak. Services call at all stations except Smallbrook Junction, which operates only during steam operating dates and times, and only one service an hour calls at Ryde Pier Head.

External links 

Railway stations on the Isle of Wight
DfT Category F2 stations
Railway stations opened by British Rail
Railway stations in Great Britain opened in 1987
Island Line railway stations (Isle of Wight)